Suddenly, Love is a 1978 American TV movie produced by Ross Hunter starring Cindy Williams.

The Los Angeles Times said it had "considerable charm".

Cast
Cindy Williams
Lew Ayres

References

External links

1978 television films
1978 films
American television films
American romantic drama films
Films directed by Stuart Margolin
1970s American films